Don Radebe (born 9 February 1997) is a South African cricketer. He made his Twenty20 debut for Limpopo in the 2018 Africa T20 Cup on 14 September 2018. In September 2019, he was named in Limpopo's squad for the 2019–20 CSA Provincial T20 Cup. In April 2021, he was named in Limpopo's squad, ahead of the 2021–22 cricket season in South Africa.

References

External links
 

1997 births
Living people
South African cricketers
Limpopo cricketers
Place of birth missing (living people)